Drury House was a historic building on Wych Street, London. It was the house of Sir Robert Drury, after whom Drury Lane was named. It was a meeting place for Robert Devereux, 2nd Earl of Essex and his accomplices in 1601, when they were plotting against Elizabeth I.

It was later rebuilt as Craven House.

References

Buildings and structures in the City of Westminster
Tudor England